Nahuel Crispiniano Rodríguez (born 20 November 1992) is an Argentine footballer who plays as a midfielder for Achirense.

Career
Rodríguez's career began in 2013 with Primera B Nacional side Douglas Haig, he had previously been in the Boca Juniors youth system; featuring in the 2012 U-20 Copa Libertadores in Peru. Rodríguez made his professional debut on 14 August 2013 during a draw with Talleres, which occurred during the 2013–14 season which he finished with one goal, versus Defensa y Justicia in their penultimate fixture, in twenty matches. In total, Rodríguez stayed for four years whilst making eighty-one appearances and scoring three goals. Douglas Haig were relegated in his final campaign. In 2017, Torneo Federal B side Achirense signed Rodríguez.

Career statistics
.

References

External links

1992 births
Living people
People from Puerto Iguazú
Argentine footballers
Association football midfielders
Primera Nacional players
Club Atlético Douglas Haig players
Sportspeople from Misiones Province